Camm or CAMM may refer to:

People 
 Amanda Camm (born 1979), Australian politician
David Camm (born 1964), former Indiana State Police acquitted of the murders of his wife and children
 Frederick James Camm (1895–1959), British technical author and magazine editor
Ron Camm (1914–1988), Australian politician
 Sydney Camm (1893–1966), British aviator
 T. W. Camm (1839–1912), English stained glass designer and manufacturer

Other uses 
 Camm, Virginia
 Common Anti-Air Modular Missile
 Council of American Maritime Museums
 Compression Attached Memory Module